This is a list of brands owned by the British multinational consumer goods company Unilever.

Unilever's billion euro brands 

These brands have annual sales of one billion euros or more:

Axe/Lynx
Dove
Omo/Persil
Heartbrand (Wall's) ice creams
Hellmann's
Knorr
Lipton
Lux
Magnum
Rexona/Degree
Lifebuoy
Sunsilk
Sunlight

Food and drink

Condiments and extracts 

 Amora – French mayonnaise and dressings (France, Belgium and Morocco)
 Aromat – seasoning (South Africa, Sweden, Switzerland)
 Best Foods – mayonnaise, sandwich spreads, peanut butter and salad dressings
 Bovril – beef extract
 Calvé – sauces, ketchup, mustard, mayonnaise, peanut butter
 Colman's – mustard, condiments, packet sauces, OK Fruity Sauce
 Conimex – Asian spices (Netherlands)
 Continental – side dishes (Australia/New Zealand)
 Chirat - pickled vegetables (pickled onions, pickled cucumbers, pickled mixes), sauces (top down in the squeeze bottles, sachets, glass jars and glass bottles), vinegars and salad dressings (Kressi), olives, mustard (top down in the squeeze bottles, sachets), capers and corn on the cob, mayonnaise (top down in the squeeze bottles, tubes, sachets), tomato ketchup (top down in the squeeze bottles, sachets) (Switzerland)
 Fanacoa – mayonnaise, mustard, ketchup (Argentina and for export to Latin America)
 Fruc – ketchup, mayonnaise and condiments
 Hellmann's – mayonnaise, ketchups, mustard, sauces, salad dressings
 Jawara – hot sauce (Indonesia)
 Knorr (Knorr-Suiza in Argentina, Royco in Indonesia and Kenya, Continental in Australia, outside Japan) – sauces, stock cubes, ready-meals, meal kits, ready-soups, frozen food range
 Kecap Bango – sweet soy sauce in Indonesia
 Kissan – ketchups, squashes and jams (India and Pakistan)
 Kuner - mayonnaise (top down in the squeeze bottles, sachets, glass jars, tubes), sauces (top down in the squeeze bottles, sachets, glass jar) (Austria)
 Lady's Choice – mayonnaise, peanut butter and sandwich spreads (Philippines, Malaysia)
 Lao Cai – seasoning
 Salsa Lizano – Costa Rican condiment
 Maille – French mustard
 Marmite – yeast extract spread (except in Australia and New Zealand, called Our Mate)
 Robertson's – spices/seasoning (South Africa)
 Royco – stock cubes, non-MSG stock (Indonesia, Kenya)
 SariWangi - Tea (Indonesia) 
 Sir Kensington's – ketchup, mustard, mayonnaise, ranch, vinaigrettes (US, Canada)
 Slott's – mustard (Sweden)
 Tortex – ketchup (Poland)
 Turun sinappi – mustard (Finland/Sweden)
 Unox – soups, smoked sausages

Desserts 

 Ben & Jerry's – ice cream
 Breyers – ice cream
 Cornetto – ice cream
 Darko (Дарко) – ice cream (Bulgaria)
 Fudgsicle – ice pops
 Grom – gelato (Italy)
 Heartbrand – ice cream (umbrella logo)
 Klondike – ice cream sandwiches
 Magnum - ice cream
 Paddle Pop – ice cream (Australia, Indonesia, Malaysia [incorporated with Wall's], discontinued in the Philippines)
 Payco – ice cream (Puerto Rico)
 Popsicle – frozen treats
 Seru – low-cost ice cream (Indonesia)
 Talenti – gelato
 Wall's - ice cream, frozen desserts
 Weis – frozen fruit desserts, ice cream

Other foods 

 Annapurna – salt and wheat flour (India)
 Knorr (Knorr-Suiza in Argentina, Royco in Indonesia and Kenya, Continental in Australia) – sauces, stock cubes, ready-meals, meal kits, ready-soups, frozen food range
 Kuner - mayonnaise (top down in the squeeze bottles, sachets, glass jars, tubes), sauces (top down in the squeeze bottles, sachets, glass bottles) (Austria)
 Hellmann's – mayonnaise, ketchups, mustard, sauces, salad dressings
 Maizena – cornstarch
 Mãe Terra – Brazilian natural and organic food business
 Chirat - pickled vegetables (pickled onions, pickled cucumbers, pickled mixes), sauces (top down in the squeeze bottles, sachets, glass jars and glass bottles), vinegars and salad dressings (Kressi), olives, mustard (top down in the squeeze bottles, sachets), capers and corn on the cob, mayonnaise (top down in the squeeze bottles, tubes, sachets), tomato ketchup (top down in the squeeze bottles, sachets) (Switzerland)
 Pfanni – German potato mixes (Germany)
 Pot Noodle – cup noodle
 Sealtest – milk products
 The Vegetarian Butcher – Vegetarian and Vegan products 
 Telma – breakfast cereal (Israel)
 Unilever Food Solutions – professional markets (food service)

Beverages 

 Bru – instant coffee (India)
 Buavita – fruit juice (Indonesia, acquired from Ultrajaya)
 Horlicks – malted milk powder (India only, acquired from GlaxoSmithKline)
 Jif – lemon and lime juice
 Lipton - tea (USA)

Ice creams 

Unilever is the world's biggest ice cream manufacturer, with an annual turnover of €5 billion. With the exception of its U.S. brands Popsicle, Klondike, Talenti gelato, Breyers and Ben & Jerry's, the bulk of the company's ice cream business falls under its "Heartbrand" brand umbrella, so called because of the brand's heart-shaped logo. Unilever currently operates twelve ice cream factories in Europe; the biggest include factories at Hellendoorn in The Netherlands, Heppenheim in Germany, Caivano in Italy, Saint-Dizier in France, Gloucester in the United Kingdom, and Olá in Portugal.

The Heartbrand was launched in 1998 (and slightly modified in 2003) as an effort to increase international brand awareness and promote cross-border synergies in manufacturing and marketing ("centralisation"). It is present in more than 40 countries.

In different countries, Heartbrand is known as:

Home care 

 All – laundry detergent (except the United States)
 Ala – laundry detergent (Argentina and North/Northeast Brazil)
 Baba (East Europe)
 Biotex – laundry detergent
 Breeze – laundry detergent (Philippines [discontinued in 2002 and reintroduced in 2013], Singapore, Malaysia and Thailand)
 Brilhante – laundry detergent (Brazil)
 Cif – cleaning products (Jif in Australia, New Zealand and the Middle East; Viss in Germany)
 Coccolino – softener (Hungary, Italy, Croatia, Poland, Romania) (Yumoş in Turkey)
 Comfort – fabric softener
 Coral / Korall – laundry detergent
 Dimension (Southeast Asia, South Asia, Middle East, North America, South America)
 Domestos (Vim in Bangladesh, Canada, India, Pakistan and Vietnam; Domex in the Philippines, India, Pakistan and Sri Lanka) – bleach (Australia, Bulgaria, Czech Republic, France, Germany, Hungary, Indonesia, Israel, Italy, Poland, Romania, Russia, South Africa, Spain, Turkey and the United Kingdom)
 Deja – laundry detergent (Ecuador)
 Lysoform – home care (Italy)
 Minerva – laundry and dishwasher detergents (Brazil)
 Molto – fabric softener (Indonesia)
 Neutral – laundry detergent
 Omo (Australia, Switzerland, Liechtenstein, South Africa, Norway, Brazil, Turkey and Chile) – laundry detergent
 Persil – this brand name is primarily operated by Henkel, but Unilever owns the rights to use the Persil name in Malaysia, Singapore, Ireland, the United Kingdom, France and New Zealand. It sells its own premium detergents under this brand, based on the Omo formula. They are not the same formulation as Henkel's Persil products, although they may occupy the same market position.
 Quix – dishwashing liquid (Chile)
 Rin  – laundry detergent (India, Bangladesh, Pakistan)
 Rinso (except the United States)
 Robijn – softener
 Skip – laundry detergent
 Sunlight (discontinued in the Philippines in 1998 as laundry detergent and reintroduced in 2015 as dishwashing liquid)
 Super Pell – floor cleaning fluid (Indonesia)
 Surf – laundry detergent (worldwide) and fabric conditioner (Philippines only) (DERO in Romania and Vietnam)
 Surf Excel – laundry detergent (India, Pakistan, Bangladesh and Sri Lanka)
 Viso – laundry detergent (Vietnam and Indonesia)
 Vixal – porcelain cleaner (Indonesia)
 Wheel - detergent (India, Bangladesh)
 Wipol – carbolic floor cleaner (Indonesia)

Beauty, well-being and personal care 

Source:

 Andrelon 
 Aviance - Beauty products
 Axe – deodorant, shower gel, body spray (Lynx in the UK, Ireland and Australia)
 Ayush (India)
 Badedas – shower gels (Elida Beauty)
 Block & White – whitening lotion (Philippines)
 Brisk – hair-styling products for men (Southeast Asia, North America)
 Brylcreem – hair-styling products for men (Elida Beauty)
 Caress – soap
 Citra – women's hand and body lotion, beauty soap, and scrubs (Indonesia, Thailand, Malaysia and the Middle East)
 Clear (Linic in Portugal, Ultrex in Greece) – anti-dandruff, scalp care shampoo and conditioner (China, Southeast Asia, Australia, Romania, Pakistan, Poland, South Africa, Hungary, United States, Canada, Latin America)
 Clinic – dandruff shampoo
 Cream Silk – conditioner (Philippines)
 Close-Up – toothpaste
 Dermalogica (USA) - skincare and spa products - acquired in 2015
 Dollar Shave Club – razors and other personal grooming products direct to consumer by mail (United States)
 Dove – skin care, hair care, and deodorant
 Dove Spa
 Dr. Kaufmann – sulfur soap (Philippines) 
 Dusch Das – shower gels and deodorants (Germany
 Eskinol – women's facial wash and cleanser (Philippines)
 Fissan – foot powder (Philippines) / baby skin care products (South Africa)(Elida Beauty)
 FDS – skin care range
 Gessy (Brazil) – soap
 Glow & Lovely – skin lightening product (available in India, Malaysia, Indonesia, Singapore, Brunei and Timor Leste)
 Good Morning – soap (Egypt)
 Hijab Fresh – body lotion for hijab wearers (Indonesia)
 Impulse – deodorant and body spray (Elida Beauty)
 Indhulekha –Shampoo and oil
 Ioma – premium skin care range
 Korea Glow – skin care range (Indonesia)
 Lakmé – cosmetics
 Lever 2000 – soap (Elida Beauty)
 Lifebuoy – rubbing alcohol (Philippines)/soap
 Living Proof: Prestige Hair Care Brand 
 Linic – dandruff shampoo (Portugal)
 Love Beauty & Planet - vegan hair and body care
 Lux – women's soap, shower gel, and lotions (Caress in the United States)
 Master – men's facial wash and cleanser (Philippines)
 Matey – children's bubble bath
 Mentadent – toothpaste (except for North America)
 Mist – soap (Egypt)
 Nameera – halal skin care range (Indonesia)
Noxzema – skin care range
 Organics – shampoo and conditioner (Elida Beauty)
 Pears Transparent Soap
 Pepsodent – dental (outside of the United States) (P/S in Vietnam)
 Pond's - beauty lotion, anti-aging, beauty cleansing foam, lightning toner and lightning cream (Elida Beauty)
 Prodent – toothpaste
 Pure Line (Middle East)
 Q-Tips – cotton swab (Elida Beauty)
 Radox – shower gels and bubble bath
 Regenerate – toothpaste
 Rexona (Degree in the United States and Canada; Sure in the United Kingdom, Ireland and India; Shield in South Africa; Rexena in Japan) – deodorant
 Sahaja – cleaning products for Muslims (Indonesia)
 Schmidt's Naturals – deodorants and soaps
 Seventh Generation – home and personal care products including bobble
 Signal – toothpaste
 Simple – skin and body care range
 SR – toothpaste
 St Ives – hand and body care (Elida Beauty)
 Suave – personal care (United States, Canada, Mexico, Brazil and Argentina)
 Sun – dishwasher detergent
 Sunsilk (Sedal in Spanish-speaking Latin American countries, Seda in Brazil, Elidor in Turkey; Hazeline in China) – shampoo and conditioner (discontinued in the United States and Canada in 2007)
 Swan Soap (defunct)
 Tatcha – Luxury skin care brand acquired on 10 June 2019 for close to $500 million 
 Thermasilk – shampoo and conditioner
 Tholl – skin care
 TIGI – shampoo and conditioner for hair salons (Elida Beauty) 
 Timotei – shampoo and conditioner (Elida Beauty)
 Toni & Guy – hair care range,(Elida Beauty)
 TRESemmé – hair care range (Argentina, Australia, Brazil, Canada, Chile, Denmark, Finland, India, Indonesia, Mexico, Norway, New Zealand, Philippines, South Africa, Spain, Sweden, Thailand, the United Kingdom and the United States)
 Vaseline – body lotion, shower gel, deodorant (Vasenol in Portugal, Brazil, Italy, Spain and Mexico)
 Vibrance – shampoo and conditioner
 Vim (Middle East)
 Vinólia – soap (Brazil)
 Vitakeratin – hair treatment (Philippines)
 White Beauty – skin lightening cream
 Williams – men's care (Elida Beauty)
 VO5 – hair care/styling (except the United States) (Elida Beauty)
 Xedex
 zendium – toothpaste
 Zhonghua – toothpaste (China)
 Zwitsal – baby care range (Netherlands and Indonesia)

Former brands 
In 2003, Unilever announced the strategic decision to sell off the Dalda brand in both India and Pakistan. In 2003, Bunge Limited acquired the Dalda brand from Hindustan Unilever Limited for reportedly under Rs 100 crore. On 30 March 2004, Unilever Pakistan accepted an offer of Rs. 1.33 billion for the sale of its Dalda brand and related business of edible oils and fats to the newly incorporated company Dalda Foods (Pvt.) Limited.

References 

Unilever brands
Unilever brands